Drope is a hamlet in the valley of the River Ely in Vale of Glamorgan, southeast Wales, just beyond the territorial border of western Cardiff. It lies immediately east from Michaelston-super-Ely, west of Ely, Cardiff and southeast of St Georges-super Ely and is accessed via a bridge along Drope Road across the A4232 road to the north of Culverhouse Cross. Drope was designated a special conservation area in March 1973 by the former Glamorgan County Council due to its architectural heritage.

Landmarks

The farms of Drope, Ty Llwyd and Ty Uchaf and The Old Rectory in Drope have been identified as buildings which make a positive contribution to the special architectural or historic interest of the conservation area. The Old Rectory dates to the early Victorian period and set in landscaped gardens, it features a slate roof under local limestone walls. To the south is Coedarhydyglyn.

References

Villages in the Vale of Glamorgan